AA2 or AA-2 may refer to:

 Vympel K-13 missile, known as the AA-2 Atoll in NATO terminology
 USS T-2 (SS-60/SF-2), an AA-1-class submarine in the service of the United States Navy, was first known as USS AA-2
 American Aviation AA-2 Patriot, a light aircraft
 Phoenix Wright: Ace Attorney − Justice for All, the second video game of the series
 America's Army 2, the second video game of the series
 AA2 is Gardiner's designated symbol for the hieroglyph that represents a pustule Aa2
 Aa2 is the third highest credit rating given by Moody's Investors Service
 Ascent Abort-2, a 2019 flight test of the launch abort system of NASA's Orion spacecraft